The 1958 U.S. Women's Open was the 13th U.S. Women's Open, held June 26–28 at Forest Lake Country Club in Bloomfield Hills, Michigan, a suburb northwest of Detroit. It was the sixth edition conducted by the United States Golf Association (USGA).

Mickey Wright, age 23, won the first of her four U.S. Women's Open titles, five strokes ahead of runner-up Louise Suggs, a two-time champion. It was the second of 13 major championships for Wright, who led wire-to-wire and entered the final round with a seven stroke lead.

This was the second major held at Forest Lake, which hosted the LPGA Championship two years earlier in 1956.

Past champions in the field

Source:

Final leaderboard
Saturday, June 28, 1958

Source:

References

External links
USGA final leaderboard
U.S. Women's Open Golf Championship
U.S. Women's Open – past champions – 1958
Forest Lake Country Club

U.S. Women's Open
Golf in Michigan
Sports competitions in Michigan
Bloomfield Hills, Michigan
U.S. Women's Open
U.S. Women's Open
U.S. Women's Open
Women's sports in Michigan